Dunn may refer to:

Dunn, Dane County, Wisconsin
Dunn, Dunn County, Wisconsin